The Domain may refer to:

 The Domain (Austin, Texas), a shopping mall
 The Domain (film), a 2019 Portuguese film
 The Domain, Sydney, a park

See also
 Domain (disambiguation)